The 2012–13 HRV Cup (named after the competition's sponsor HRV) was the eighth season of the Men's Super Smash Twenty20 cricket tournament in New Zealand.  The season was held between 2 November 2012 and 20 January 2013. 12 matches were telecasted on Friday nights during November and December.

Rules and regulations

If a match ends with the scores level, the tie is broken with a Super Over.

Teams and standings

(C) = Eventual champion; (R) = Runner-up.
Winner will qualify for the qualifying stage of the 2013 Champions League Twenty20.

League progression

Results

Fixtures
All times shown are in New Zealand Daylight Time (UTC+13).

Group stage

Knockout stage

Preliminary final

Final

References

External links
Tournament site on ESPN Cricinfo

Super Smash (cricket)
HRV
HRV Cup